Tom Lin (born 13 February 1973) is a Taiwanese-American evangelical and the eighth  president of InterVarsity Christian Fellowship, an evangelical parachurch organization which works with 40,200 university students.

Biography 
Raised in Chicago to Taiwanese immigrant parents, Lin completed a B.A. in Economics from Harvard University in 1994 and an M.A. in Global Leadership from Fuller Theological Seminary.

From 1994 until 2001, Lin helped to start local chapters of InterVarsity Christian Fellowship at Harvard University and Boston University, after which he was the Mongolia country director of International Fellowship of Evangelical Students, from 2002 to 2006. Lin and his family returned to the United States in 2006, taking up various positions in InterVarsity Christian Fellowship, including directing the Urbana Student Missions Conference and, in August 2016, becoming the organization's first non-white president. Lin believes he was appointed the position because of his leadership in crossing racial, cultural, and ethnic barriers.

While in 2018, InterVarsity had over 1,000 chapters of its organization on 700 college campuses, Lin has set a goal of establishing chapters on 2,500 college campuses.

Controversy 
In 2015, then president-elect Lin and interim president of InterVarsity Jim Lundgren issued a 20-page position paper highlighting views on divorce, extramarital sex, and gay marriage, and initiating a process of involuntary terminations of staff who disagreed with these positions. Critics have held that this marginalizes members who are LGBTI or supporters of same-sex marriage.

Works

References 

1973 births
Living people
Harvard University alumni
Fuller Theological Seminary alumni
American people of Taiwanese descent
American evangelicals
American Protestant religious leaders